Maestir is a hamlet in the community of Llanwnnen, Ceredigion, Wales, which is 59.9 miles (96.3 km) from Cardiff and 175.5 miles (282.4 km) from London. Maestir is represented in the Senedd by Elin Jones (Plaid Cymru) and is part of the Ceredigion constituency in the House of Commons.

References

See also 
 List of localities in Wales by population

Villages in Ceredigion